Odile Arboles-Souchon (born 23 January 1975) is a French diver. She competed in two events at the 2000 Summer Olympics.

References

1975 births
Living people
French female divers
Olympic divers of France
Divers at the 2000 Summer Olympics
Sportspeople from Madrid